Golam Mostafa Khan ( – 13 November 2022) was a Bangladeshi dance artist. He was awarded Ekushey Padak in 2020 and Shilpakala Padak in 2016 by the Government of Bangladesh.

Khan died in Dhaka on 13 November 2022, at the age of 82.

Awards
 Shilpakala Padak (2016)
 Ekushey Padak (2020)

References

20th-century births
Year of birth missing
Place of birth missing
2022 deaths
Bangladeshi male dancers
Recipients of the Ekushey Padak